George Owu (born 7 July 1982) is a Ghanaian former professional footballer who played as a goalkeeper.

Club career 
Owu was born  in Accra. He signed for Egyptian Premier League side Al-Masry. He moved from Ashanti Gold. His performances earned him a trial with Premier League side Tottenham Hotspur but was not offered a contract.

He returned to his homeland Ghana and signed for Cape Coast Ebusua Dwarfs in October 2010.
In December 2012, it was confirmed that Owu rejoined his first professional club Sekondi Hasaacas on a one-year deal.

He helped Ashanti Gold avoid relegation in the 2017 season.

International career 
Owu was part of the Ghanaian 2004 Olympic football team, who exited in the first round, having finished in third place in group B. He played his first game for the Ghana national team on 19 November 2003 and was the second goalkeeper at the 2006 Africa Cup of Nations in Egypt 2006.

With both Sammy Adjei and Philemon McCarthy injured, Owu played in a qualification match for the 2006 FIFA World Cup against South Africa. He kept a clean sheet helping Ghana secure a 2–0 away win. He was also the second goalkeeper for the Germany. He was the goalkeeper for the 2008 Africa Cup of Nations hosted in Ghana.

Honours 
 FIFA World Youth Championship runner-up: 2001

References

External links 
 Fifa 2006 World Cup Profile
 Ghana Football Association - official website
 

1982 births
Living people
Ghanaian footballers
Footballers from Accra
Association football goalkeepers
Ghana international footballers
Ghana under-20 international footballers
Olympic footballers of Ghana
Footballers at the 2004 Summer Olympics
2006 Africa Cup of Nations players
2006 FIFA World Cup players
Sekondi Hasaacas F.C. players
Asante Kotoko S.C. players
Al Masry SC players
Ghanaian expatriate footballers
Ghanaian expatriate sportspeople in Egypt
Expatriate footballers in Egypt